NUV may refer to:
Young Liberals of Norway (Norwegian: Norges Unge Venstre (NUV))
Near visible ultraviolet (NUV) light with wavelength from 300 nm – 400 nm
Navrachana university vadodara
MythTV internal file format '.nuv